The 1819 Vermont gubernatorial election for Governor of Vermont took place in September and October, and resulted in the election of Jonas Galusha to a one-year term.

The Vermont General Assembly met in Montpelier on October 14. The Vermont House of Representatives appointed a committee to review the votes of the freemen of Vermont for governor, lieutenant governor, treasurer, and members of the governor's council. With the Federalist Party no longer a force in Vermont politics, the committee determined that incumbent Jonas Galusha had won a one-year term, defeating fellow Democratic-Republicans William Czar Bradley and Dudley Chase. 

In the election for lieutenant governor, the legislature's canvassing committee determined that Paul Brigham had won election to a one-year term by defeating former lieutenant governor William Chamberlain and James D. Butler. According to a contemporary newspaper article, the vote totals were: Brigham 12,348 (85.0%); Chamberlain, 1,150 (7.9%); Butler, 265 (1.8%); scattering, 765 (5.3%).

Benjamin Swan was elected to a one-year term as treasurer, his twentieth. Nominally a Federalist, Swan was usually unopposed; in 1819 he received 11,652 votes, with no votes recorded for any other candidate.

In the race for governor, the results of the popular vote were reported as follows.

Results

References

Vermont gubernatorial elections
gubernatorial
Vermont